“True Blue” was the debut single from the indiepop band Tullycraft.

Track listing
 True Blue (3:03)
 Skyway (1:39)
 Superboy & Supergirl (3:02)

Personnel
 Sean Tollefson – vocals, bass
 Jeff Fell – drums
 Gary Miklusek – guitar, backing vocals
 Pat Maley – production, audio engineering, keyboards
 Aaron Gorseth – production assistance

References

 Strong, M. C. (2003). The Great Indie Discography (2nd Edition) pg. 1041. Published by Canon Books Ltd. (US/CAN) .
 Discogs . True Blue. Retrieved on November 14, 2008.

1990 singles
1990 songs